Pirgula atrinotata is a moth in the subfamily Lymantriinae. It is found in Malawi, Mozambique, Zambia and Tanzania.

References

Moths described in 1897
Lymantriinae
Lepidoptera of Malawi
Lepidoptera of Tanzania
Moths of Sub-Saharan Africa